is a passenger railway station located in Kōhoku-ku, Yokohama, Kanagawa Prefecture, Japan, operated by the private railway company Tokyu Corporation.

Lines

Station layout
The station consists of two elevated opposed side platforms, with the station building and bus terminal underneath.

Platforms

History
It received its present name on October 20, 1944. The station was rebuilt and tracks were elevated in November 1963 and the station building was refurbished in 2001, with a new North Exit and see-through ticket gates at the main entrance, as well as new escalators and elevators.

Passenger statistics
In fiscal 2019, the station was used by an average of 103,630 passengers daily. 

The passenger figures for previous years are as shown below.

Surrounding area
Shin-tsunashima Station, very close to this station, but fares are treated separately.
 Tsunashima Onsen
 Tsurumi River
Otsuna Bridge
 Tsunashima Kofun
Yokohama City Tsunashima District Center

See also
 List of railway stations in Japan

References

External links

 

Railway stations in Kanagawa Prefecture
Railway stations in Japan opened in 1926
Tokyu Toyoko Line
Stations of Tokyu Corporation
Railway stations in Yokohama